Georgios D. Orphanidis (1859–1942) was a Greek sports shooter.  He competed at the 1896 Summer Olympics in Athens and at the 1908 Summer Olympics in London. He also competed at the 1906 Intercalated Games.

Orphanidis competed in all five of the shooting events: military rifle, free rifle, military pistol, rapid fire pistol, and free pistol.  The first event held was the military rifle competition, in which Orphanidis placed fifth after scoring 1,698 points.  His place in the second event, the military pistol, is unknown but he did not win a medal.  He finished last place (of five) in the free pistol.

Success came late in the competition for Orphanidis, as he placed second in his penultimate event, the rapid fire pistol.  He scored 249 points on 20 hits in the event, finishing behind Ioannis Frangoudis.  In the free rifle, Orphanidis defeated Frangoudis and the rest of the marksmen to win an Olympic championship.  His score of 1,583 was bolstered by a second-string score of 520 in which he hit the target with all 10 shots.  The results for the first, third, and fourth strings were 328, 420, and 315 points, respectively.  Orphanidis missed only three times out of the 40 shots; twice in the first string and once in the fourth.

References

External links

1859 births
1942 deaths
Sportspeople from İzmir
Smyrniote Greeks
Shooters at the 1896 Summer Olympics
19th-century sportsmen
Shooters at the 1906 Intercalated Games
Shooters at the 1908 Summer Olympics
Greek male sport shooters
ISSF rifle shooters
ISSF pistol shooters
Olympic shooters of Greece
Olympic gold medalists for Greece
Olympic silver medalists for Greece
Olympic medalists in shooting
Medalists at the 1896 Summer Olympics
Medalists at the 1906 Intercalated Games
Date of birth missing
Date of death missing
Place of death missing